Werra (A514) is the fourth ship of the s of the German Navy.

Development 

The Elbe-class replenishment ships are also known tenders of the German Navy. In German, this type of ship is called Versorgungsschiffe which can be translated as "supply ship" though the official translation in English is "replenishment ship". 

They are intended to support German naval units away from their home ports. The ships carry fuel, provisions, ammunition and other matériel and also provide medical services. The ships are named after German rivers where German parliaments were placed.

Construction and career 
Werra was launched in June 1993 in Bremen-Vegesack, Germany. She was commissioned on 9 December 1993.

On 2 February 2019, Rhein left her home port of Kiel. The ship, which is part of the support squadron, will be the flagship of the Standing NATO Mine Countermeasures Group 2 (SNMCMG2) and the Mediterranean for the next five months.

Gallery

References

External links 

Elbe-class replenishment ships
1993 ships
Ships built in Bremen (state)